Hockey Club Lodi was a roller hockey team from Lodi, Italy. It was founded in 1948 and it was dissolved in 1996 due to financial hardship.

See also 
 Amatori Wasken Lodi

References 
 
 

Roller hockey clubs in Italy
Sports clubs established in 1948
1948 establishments in Italy
Defunct sports teams in Italy